WLAN (1390 kHz, "Rumba 100.5") is a commercial AM radio station licensed to serve Lancaster, Pennsylvania. The station is owned by iHeartMedia, Inc. through licensee iHM Licenses, LLC, and airs a Spanish tropical music format.

History
WLAN signed on for the first time on August 9, 1946.  The station was originally owned by The Altdoerffer Family of Lancaster County, Pennsylvania. In January 1948, the Federal Communications Commission authorized WLAN to change from 1000 watts (daytime only) to 1000 watts (full-time), concurrent with a change in frequency from 1320 kHz to 1390 kHz.  In 1949, a companion FM station was added, WLAN-FM. In the 1960s and 70s, WLAN offered a Top 40 format and was an affiliate of the ABC Radio Contemporary Network. As Top 40 music listening switched to FM, WLAN became an Adult contemporary music station, and by the early 2000s it switched to adult standards.

On January 4, 2010, WLAN changed its format from standards to classic hits. Then, on February 7, 2012, the station switched to a conservative Talk radio format, simulcast from co-owned WHP in Harrisburg, Pennsylvania. Programming included Glenn Beck, Rush Limbaugh, and other nationally syndicated conservative talk hosts, plus WHP's own RJ Harris & Bob During.

On January 7, 2010, WLAN informed the FCC that it was about to lose its long-time transmitter site. Franklin & Marshall College, which owned the site, decided not to renew the lease. WLAN chose to apply to move its transmitter to the WLPA transmitter site and diplex its signal into WLPA's non-directional antenna. The change from a directional antenna array at the former site to a non-directional antenna resulted in WLAN having to reduce power from 5,000 watts day/1,000 watts night to 1,100 watts day/18 watts night, with a corresponding downgrade from Class B to Class D. The FCC granted WLAN a new license with the updated facilities on August 23, 2010.

On May 4, 2015, the station changed format to Spanish Tropical music and changed branding to "Rumba 1390". The station caters to the Lancaster Hispanic community and is fully automated (DJs are located in other cities and use pre-recorded voice tracks with no live on-air personalities).

In May 2017, WLAN began simulcasting on FM translator W226CC, Lancaster. The station's branding was changed to "Rumba 93.1".

On September 15, 2017, the FCC received an interference complaint from the owner of WLEB-LP, alleging interference being caused to at least 56 WLEB-LP listeners by W226CC operations. The complaint contained written declarations from 56 WLEB-LP listeners, documenting where the interference was occurring now that W266CC was on the air. As a result, the FCC required the translator to move to 100.5, with a corresponding change in call sign to W263DB effective October 24, 2017. WLAN subsequently rebranded as "Rumba 100.5".

Translator
WLAN programming is simulcast on the following translator:

References

External links
 

 

LAN (AM)
Mass media in Lancaster, Pennsylvania
Radio stations established in 1946
1946 establishments in Pennsylvania
IHeartMedia radio stations
Spanish-language radio stations in Pennsylvania